Arun Firodia (born 1943) is an Indian businessman. He is the chairman of Kinetic Group, India's leading manufacturers and exporters of two wheelers. Arun Firodia obtained his B.Tech with distinction in Electrical Engineering from IIT, Mumbai in 1965. He later went to US and obtained his M.S. in Electrical Engineering from MIT. He completed his M.S. in Management from Sloan School of Management.

He was awarded the Padma Shri, fourth highest civilian award of India, in 2012.

Personal life
Arun Firodia is the son of late Shri. H.K. Firodia, founder of Kinetic Engineering Limited, married to Dr Jayshree Firodia who is a renowned Pediatrician. They have one son Ajinkya Firodia and three daughters Sulajja Firodia Motwani,  Vismaya Firodia and Kimaya Firodia.

References

External links
 Arun Firodia Kinetic Groups's chairman profile  
 Kinetic Honda – The Break-Up: Break-Up Blues
 Arun Firodia

1943 births
Living people
Businesspeople from Maharashtra
Recipients of the Padma Shri in trade and industry
IIT Bombay alumni